Peabody-Burns Junior/Senior High School is a public secondary school in Peabody, Kansas, United States.  It is the sole high school operated by Peabody–Burns USD 398 school district.  It serves students of grades 7 to 12 in the communities of Peabody, Burns, Wonsevu, and nearby rural areas of Marion / Chase / Harvey / Butler Counties.

History

19th century
The first school in Peabody was organized in 1871.  The first school building, two limestone rooms, was built in 1872 on the northeast corner of Maple and 2nd.  The first high school classes were taught in 1879, and the first graduation class in 1881 consisted of 2 students.  As the student population grew, the school building was expanded.  In 1883, a six room addition was erected.  In 1901, a four room addition was erected, bringing the linestone school to a total of twelve rooms on two floors.  Before fall of 1923, all grades attended this school. It was closed after the current elementary school was built in 1974 then it was demolished.

20th century

In 1923, a two-story brick high school was built at 900 North Walnut Street for grades 9 to 12.

In 1945, the School Reorganization Act in Kansas caused the consolidation of thousands of rural school districts in Kansas.  

In 1946-1947, many one-room rural schools consolidated into the Peabody school district.

In 1953, the Brown Building was built across the street east of the 1923 high school to house a larger gymnasium, band / lunch room, and vocational agriculture rooms.

In 1963, the School Unification Act in Kansas caused the further consolidatation of thousands of tiny school districts into hundreds of larger Unified School Districts.

In 1965, the Burns and Summit school districts were unified with Peabody to form the Unified School District 398.  The Burns High School in Burns, Kansas was closed, as was the rural Summit school that was located between Peabody and Burns.

In 1997, the current high school was built (and attached) to the south side of the existing Brown Building at 810 North Sycamore Street.  Soon afterward, the former 1923 high school across the street was demolished and converted into a football practice field.  The Burns Grade School, which included a junior high, was closed in Burns, Kansas.

21st century
Currently all students in the USD 398 district attend the high school and grade school in Peabody.

Historical school names
 Peabody High School (prior to 1965)
 Peabody-Burns High School (1965 to 1997)
 Peabody-Burns Junior/Senior High School (1997 to current)

Academics
The high school marching band is well known in competitions, and especially popular in regional parades.  The high school is a member of T.E.E.N., a shared video teaching network, started in 1993, between five area high schools.

Enrollment
In the 2010–2011 school year, Peabody-Burns Junior High School had an enrollment of 63 students, and Peabody-Burns High School had an enrollment of 105 students.

Extracurricular activities

The sports offered are Basketball, Bowling, Cross Country, Cheerleading, Football, Golf, Softball, Track, Volleyball, Wrestling. The mascot is a Warrior. All high school athletic and non-athletic competition is overseen by the Kansas State High School Activities Association. For 2010/2011 seasons, the football team competes as Class 8 Man - Division I in the Wheat State league.

State championships

Peabody-Burns High School
After 1964-1965 Peabody / Burns / Summit school districts consolidated into USD 398.

Boys Football:
 1977, Class 2A, 2nd Place against Beloit, Head Coach Dennis Franchione.

Boys Golf:
 2001, Class S (sand), Mike Hurst (Medalist).

Boys Cross Country:
 2005, Class 2A, Andrew Topham (Individual).
 2006, Class 2A, Andrew Topham (Individual).

Girls Cross Country:
 1989, Class 2-1A, Laurie Miles (Individual).

Girls Outdoor Track & Field:
 1981, Class 2A, 800-Meter Run, 2:11.50 Seconds, Lucille Carson (Individual).
 2010, Class 2A, 400-Meter Dash, 56.58 Seconds, Lauren Pickens (Individual).

Cheer - Game Day Spirit Showcase:
 2019, Class 1A.

Peabody High School
Before 1964-1965 Peabody / Burns / Summit school districts consolidated.

Boys Basketball:
 1962, Class B, 2nd Place against Melvern, Head Coach Cal Reimer.
 1963, Class B, 1st Place against Hill City, Head Coach Cal Reimer.

Girls Basketball:
 1913, Class ?, 2nd Place.

Debate:
 1924, Class A.

Burns High School
Before 1964-1965 Peabody / Burns / Summit school districts consolidated.

Boys Basketball:
 1953, Class BB, 1st Place against Simpson, High School Boys Basketball, Head Coach Harvey Loy.

Hosted tournaments
The following state tournaments were hosted in Peabody.

Boys State Baseball:
 1950 to 1960 (11 years), Class B. Held at the Peabody City Park.

Boys State Golf:
 1984 / 1986 / 1991 (3 years), Class S (sand).

Administration history

Superintendents

High School Principals
Decades ago, Principals use to teach class in addition to their administrative roles.  The notes columns lists other jobs held within the same school district (not exhaustive, and may be missing some information).

Notable people

Faculty
 C. M. Arbuthnot (1852-1920), physician, founder of Arbuthnot Drug Company, Principal in Peabody for two years.
 Dennis W. Franchione (born 1951), head college football coach at Southwestern College, Pittsburg State University, University of New Mexico, Texas Christian University, University of Alabama, Texas A&M University, Texas State University.  Head football coach of Peabody High School from 1976 to 1977.

Alumni
 Warren A. Bechtel (1872–1933) (class of 1891), founder of Bechtel Corporation. In 1925, Warren, his three sons, and his brother Arthur (from Peabody) joined together to form the W.A. Bechtel Company, and was one of the Six Companies, Inc. that constructed the Hoover Dam, then later became Bechtel Corporation (as of 2018, the largest construction company in the United States and 11th-largest privately-owned company in the United States).
 Rebecca L. Ediger (born 1952) (class of 1970), United States Secret Service agent, Special Award for Distinguished Service to the Executive Office of the President.

School district
List of notable students who attended schools in Peabody, but graduated from another high school:
 Nick Hague (born 1975), NASA astronaut, Colonel in United States Air Force, deployed in Iraq War, test pilot at 416th Flight Test Squadron, teacher at United States Air Force Academy.  Nick attended school in Peabody from 1982 to 1989 while his father was Principal of Peabody-Burns High School.
 Willard J. Madsen (1930-2016), professor emeritus at Gallaudet University, sign language expert, author of two sign language text books, attended grade school in Peabody.

See also
 Peabody City Park, location of football field
 Peabody Gazette-Bulletin, local newspaper, contains stories about USD 398 school district
 List of high schools in Kansas
 List of unified school districts in Kansas

References

Further reading

 Follow-up study of the male graduates of the Peabody High School from 1951 to 1966; Gary L. Jones; Kansas State University; 56 pages; 1967.
 Peabody : The First 100 Years; Peabody Historical Society; Peabody Gazette-Herald in Peabody, KS; 123 pages; 1971. (contains school history)
 The Women of Peabody; Peabody Historical Society; Mennonite Press in Newton, KS; 250 pages; 2010; LCCN 2010928692. (contains memories from some former school teachers)

External links

School
 District Website
 USD 398 School District Boundary Map, KDOT
 Peabody City Map, KDOT
Alumni
 List of Peabody High School Alumni from 1881 to 1913
 1936 Peabody High Senior Class
Historical
 1901 photo of Peabody Board Of Education for District 12 of Marion County, D.F. Rhodes / A.N. Eaton / J.O. Moffett / W.M. Irwin / F.E. Butler / T.M. Potter.

Schools in Marion County, Kansas
Public high schools in Kansas
Public middle schools in Kansas
Educational institutions established in 1879
1879 establishments in Kansas